The Early February 2016 nor'easter was a potent nor'easter moved up the east coast, causing more snow to the already-weary Northeast United States after the leading edge of the previous system and the historic blizzard of January 21–23. Strong wind gusts were also reported along the eastern edge of New England. The Nor’easter was named Winter Storm Mars by the weather channel.



Meteorological history 

On February 7, an elongated area of low pressure developed offshore to the west of Florida. While moving inland, it produced a decent dose of rainfall to the Sunshine State as it moved to the northeast. EST February 8. As it did so, it also began to transition into a nor'easter, as rainbands began to impact the eastern edges of North Carolina and South Carolina. There was some cold air aloft, allowing for a few areas of wet snow to develop further inland.

As the cyclone continued to strengthen, it started to achieve the conditions of a bomb cyclone. Furthermore, the system started to form an eye compared to that of a typical Category 1 hurricane, however this was short-lived and dissolved a few hours later. Snowbands began to impact New England early in the morning of February 8, with some bands reaching up to snowfall rates of an inch per hour, especially near the coast. The outermost bands did not reach New Jersey and New York City, due to the nor'easter being far offshore. The system then continued to weaken as it moved northward, before finally merging with another low pressure system on February 10 to the south of it which had also exited from the East Coast.

Snowfall totals 

The following is a list of snowfall totals from the system.

Source:

References 

2015–16 North American winter
2016 meteorology
February 2016 events in the United States
2016 natural disasters in the United States
Natural disasters in Massachusetts